"Gitty Up" is a song by American hip hop girl group Salt-N-Pepa from their fifth studio album, Brand New (1997). It was released as the album's second and final single.  The song samples the bass line and the lyric "Say what?" from the song "Give It to Me Baby" by Rick James.

Track listings
 CD single
 "Gitty Up" (Album Version) 
 "Gitty Up" (Bystorm Mix 1) 
 "Gitty Up" (Soul Solution Mix) 
 "Gitty Up" (Bystorm Mix 1 Instrumental) 

 12-inch single
A1. "Gitty Up" (Album Version) 
A2. "Gitty Up" (Bystorm Mix 1) 
A3. "Gitty Up" (Soul Solution Mix) 
A4. "Gitty Up" (Bystorm Mix 1 Instrumental) 
B1. "Gitty Up" (Bystorm Mix 2) 
B2. "Gitty Up" (Bystorm Mix 2 Instrumental) 
B3. "Gitty Up" (Album Instrumental)

Charts

The Brick Track Versus Gitty Up

In 1999, "Gitty Up" was remixed by Robert Jazayeri and Sean Mathers and re-released under the title "The Brick Track Versus Gitty Up" (sometimes titled "The Brick Song Versus Gitty Up"). It samples "Another Brick in the Wall part 2" by Pink Floyd. The song was released as the first single from Salt-N-Pepa's 1999 greatest hits album, The Best of Salt-N-Pepa, and reached number four in New Zealand and number 16 in Australia. It was certified Gold in both countries.

Track listings
Australian CD single
 "The Brick Track Versus Gitty Up" (Rickidy Raw Hide radio mix) – 3:12
 "Whatta Man" (radio edit featuting En Vogue) – 4:10
 "Let's Talk About Sex" – 3:31
 "Gitty Up" (original version) – 4:02

European CD single
 "The Brick Track Versus Gitty Up" (Rickidy Raw Hide radio mix) – 3:12
 "Gitty Up" (original version) – 4:03
 "Push It (Again)" (DJ Tonka remix edit) – 5:18

Charts

Weekly charts

Year-end charts

Certifications

References

1997 singles
1997 songs
1999 singles
London Records singles
Music videos directed by Paul Hunter (director)
Salt-N-Pepa songs
Songs written by Rick James